The Geo-IK-2 is a Russian series of new generation military geodesy satellites replacing the Soviet Union's Geo-IK and Sfera constellations. They are intended to be used to create high precision three-dimensional maps of the Earth's surface, and to monitor plate tectonics.

Not to be confused with the Napryazhenie / 14F150 / Nivelir military geodesy satellites.

Launches

See also

 Satellite geodesy
 List of Kosmos satellites (2501–2750)

References

Earth observation satellites of Russia
Geodetic satellites
Kosmos satellites